Reginald Gillard  (13 March 1920 – 16 August 2001) was an Australian politician. Born in Lithgow, New South Wales, he was a managing partner before his military service (1941–46). Long prominent in local politics, he served as mayor of Lithgow City Council from 1969 to 1972, and again from 1973 to 1976.

In 1975, he was elected to the Australian House of Representatives as the Liberal member for Macquarie. He held the seat until his defeat at the 1980 election by Labor's Ross Free.

Gillard was awarded the Medal of the Order of Australia (OAM) in the 1998 Australia Day Honours for "service to local government, the community and the Australian parliament". In September 2000 he received the Australian Sports Medal for his "service to administration of lawn bowls".

Gillard died in 2001. He was not related to Julia Gillard, the former Prime Minister of Australia.

References

1920 births
2001 deaths
Liberal Party of Australia members of the Parliament of Australia
Members of the Australian House of Representatives for Macquarie
Members of the Australian House of Representatives
Recipients of the Medal of the Order of Australia
People from the Central Tablelands
20th-century Australian politicians